Doddipatla is a village in West Godavari district of the Indian state of Andhra Pradesh. It is located in Yelamanchili Mandal. The nearest railway station is at Palakollu (PKO) located at a distance of 15 kms

Geography 
Doddipatla is Located at Latitude of 16°31'0"N & Longitude of 81°50'37"E.

Demographics 

 Census of India, Doddipatla had a population of 13258. The total population constitute, 6835 males and 6423 females with a sex ratio of 940 females per 1000 males. 1333 children are in the age group of 0–6 years, with sex ratio of 940. The average literacy rate stands at 74.46%.

References

Villages in West Godavari district